The fourth edition of the Caribbean Series (Serie del Caribe) was played in 1952. It was held from February 20 through February 26, featuring the champion baseball teams of Cuba, Leones de la Habana; Panama, Carta Vieja Yankees; Puerto Rico, Senadores de San Juan and  Venezuela, Cervecería Caracas. The format consisted of 12 games, each team facing the other teams twice, and the games were played at Panama City.  The first pitch was thrown by Alcibíades Arosemena, by then the President of Panama.

Summary
Cuba became the first country to win two Caribbean Series championships with an undefeated record of 5–0. The Cuban team, with manager/catcher Mike González at the helm, won the Series behind a strong pitching effort by Tommy Fine, who posted a 2–0 record with a 1.50 ERA in two complete-games and won Most Valuable Player honors. After a 3–3 tie against Puerto Rico in the Series opener, he was called by the Cuban team as a late replacement for future Hall of Famer Hoyt Wilhelm. Fine posted the only no-hitter pitched in any Caribbean series game, to give his team a 1–0 win against Venezuela. Five days later, Fine faced Panama's club and was close to glory. He was three outs from consecutive no-hitters in the series, having allowed a single in the ninth inning to break it up. His 17 hitless streak also is the longest in series history. Outfielder Sandy Amorós led series hitters with a .450 batting average (9-for-20), including personal numbers with a .650 SLG, six runs, six RBI. Other contributions came from OF Fernando Pedroso (.400), catcher Andrés Fleitas (.304), and infielders Lou Klein (.333) and Spider Jorgensen, who hit two of the team's three home runs.

The clubs from Panama and Venezuela tied for second place with a 3–3 record. Panama was managed by Al Leap and included in the roster infielders Spook Jacobs, Joe Tuminelli and Jim Cronin, catcher León Kellman, and pitchers Connie Johnson and Marion Fricano.

The Venezuelan club, led by José Antonio Casanova, featured players as right fielder Wilmer Fields (.360, two HR, .720 SLG, 8 RBI), shortstop Chico Carrasquel and third baseman Luis García, as well as catcher/outfielder Guillermo Vento and pitchers José Bracho, Emilio Cueche, Bob Griffith, Johnny Hetki, Al Papai and Luis Zuloaga. In addition, center fielder Héctor Benítez and third baseman Buddy Hicks joined Fields in the All-Star team.

After a tied game with Cuba, Puerto Rico's team failed to win in their next five games. Managed by Fred Thon, their roster included outfielders Nino Escalera and Luis Rodríguez Olmo; pitchers Red Adams, Luis Arroyo, Art Ditmar and Pantalones Santiago, and OF/P Cot Deal.

Participating teams

Final standings

Scoreboards

Game 1, February 20

Game 2, February 20

Game 3, February 21

Game 4, February 21

Game 5, February 22

Game 6, February 22

Game 7, February 23

Game 8, February 23

Game 9, February 24

Game 10, February 25

Game 11, February 26

Game 12, February 26

Statistics leaders

Awards

See also
Ballplayers who have played in the Series

References

Sources
Antero Núñez, José. Series del Caribe. Jefferson, Caracas, Venezuela: Impresos Urbina, C.A., 1987.
Gutiérrez, Daniel. Enciclopedia del Béisbol en Venezuela – 1895-2006 . Caracas, Venezuela: Impresión Arte, C.A., 2007.

External links
Official site
Latino Baseball
Series del Caribe, Las (Spanish)
  
  

Caribbean
Caribbean Series
International baseball competitions hosted by Panama
Sports competitions in Panama
1952 in Panama
1952 in Caribbean sport
Caribbean Series
Caribbean Series
20th century in Panama City